Gloria Rudi Rodríguez Santo (born 26 October 1960) is a Uruguayan journalist, civil servant, activist and politician of the National Party (PN), serving as Senator since 15 February 2020. She is fourth in the line of presidential succession.

Biography 
Gloria Rodríguez was born in 1960 in Melo, Cerro Largo Department. Her father, was a policeman, and her mother, a domestic worker. Her parents knew Jorge Silveira Zabala, a leader of the National Party in Cerro Largo, who was the one who transmitted the ideology to her. In 1991, after divorcing, she moved to Montevideo with her children and great-grandmother. She settled in the barrio Malvín Norte. She worked as a secretary at the Colegio María Auxiliadora, as a shop assistant and as an official of the Ministry of Transport and Public Works, and the Ministry of Education and Culture. She studied journalism at the Professional Institute of Journalism Teaching (IPEP).

Political career and activism 
Rodríguez began her militancy in the 90s, distributing ballots from List 71, of the Herrerism faction of the National Party in Malvín Norte. During the 2002 Uruguay banking crisis, she set up a community soup kitchen, which fed 70 children in the area. Since then she has been dedicated to community work in slums.

She participated in the 2014 general election as a member of Todos, a faction led by Luis Lacalle Pou. She ran for a seat in the Chamber of Deputies, being elected National Representative for the 48th Legislature. She took office on February 15, 2015, becoming the first Afro-Uruguayan woman to hold a seat in the lower house of the General Assembly of Uruguay. In the 2019 election, she was elected Senator for the 49th Legislature. Thus she became the first Afro-Uruguayan woman to hold a senatorial seat in Uruguay. She stated "we have to work a lot so that the fact that a black woman reaches Parliament does not surprise anyone".

References

External links 
 Gloria Rodríguez's virtual office
 
 

Living people
1960 births
Uruguayan journalists
Uruguayan women journalists
Members of the Chamber of Representatives of Uruguay
Members of the Senate of Uruguay
National Party (Uruguay) politicians
Uruguayan activists
People from Melo, Uruguay
21st-century Uruguayan women politicians
21st-century Uruguayan politicians